Actress is the highest mountain in the Lemon Range, Sermersooq municipality, eastern Greenland.

It was climbed in the 1990s by Tom Chamberlain.

Geography
It is a rocky peak with a vertical icy crevice running along its southern face. This mountain is marked as an  peak in the Defense Mapping Agency Greenland Navigation charts.

The latter is located further south in a more accessible area and "Cathedral" was formerly confused with Actress, the true highest point of the Lemon Range.

See also
List of mountains in Greenland

References

External links
American Alpine Club - Exploring Greenland's Lemon Bjerge
Alpine Journal - The Lemon Mountains of East Greenland

Actress
Sermersooq